The men's points race, or “Course de Primes,” was a track cycling event at the 1900 Summer Olympics. The competition was held on 15 September 1900 at the Vélodrome de Vincennes. There were 13 competitors from 3 nations. The event was won by Enrico Brusoni of Italy, who won 5 of the laps including the last one. Karl Duill of Germany placed second, with Louis Trousselier of France third.

Background

This was the first appearance of the event. It would not be held again until 1984; after that, it was held every Summer Games until 2008 when it was removed from the programme. The women's version was held from 1996 through 2008.

Competition format

The competition was broadly similar to the modern points race, but with significant differences. The event was 5 kilometres in length, with points awarded at each lap (prime) to the first three cyclists to finish the lap: 3 to the first to finish the lap, 2 to the second, and 1 to the third. The cyclist with the most points was the victor. On the last lap, the points were tripled: 9 to the winner of the race, 6 to second place, and 3 to third place.

A single race was held, with all cyclists starting together.

Schedule

Results

The event was held on 15 September. Ferdinand Vasserot won the first lap, but failed to gain more than 1 more point the rest of the way. Enrico Brusoni won the second and third laps to move into the lead with 6 points, with Louis Trousselier behind him on both of those laps for 4 points and second place. J. Bérard was the fourth-lap winner, moving between Brusoni and Trousselier with 5 points. Brusoni won the fifth lap to increase his lead, 9 points to Bérard's 5 and Trousselier's 4.

The sixth and seventh laps went to Karl Duill, bringing him to 7 points and second place only 2 points behind Brusoni; Trousselier picked up 2 points on the sixth to stay in third place as Bérard dropped to fourth. The top three spots would not change again after that. Brusoni re-extended his lead on the eighth lap, winning it to place him at 12 points to Duill's 7. In the ninth lap, Trousselier won with Duill behind him; this brought them both to 9 points, only 3 points behind Brusoni. 

Brusoni finished strong, however, with a win on the triple-value final lap for 9 points to take the top overall score at 21 points. Neither Duill nor Trousselier was able to score on that final lap. Duill held a tie-breaker over Trousselier, taking second place. Chaput's second-place finish on the last lap brought him 1 point behind the medalists.

References

Men's points race
Cycling at the Summer Olympics – Men's points race